"Comme facette mammeta" is a song published in 1906 by Salvatore Gambardella and Giuseppe Capaldo, whose title may be translated as "How your mother made you".

Recordings 
Mario Lanza in 1961 (see Mario Lanza discography)
Sergio Franchi (see List of songs recorded by Sergio Franchi)
Renzo Arbore with L'Orchestra Italiana. This version was played throughout the opening credits and introductory scene of the film OK Garage.
As performed by Pietra Montecorvino in the 2010 film Passione

See also 
"Comme facette mammeta" in the Italian Wikipedia.

References 

Neapolitan songs
Italian songs
1906 songs